Eddie Duffy (1894–1986) was a traditional Irish musician.  Many of his songs and tunes came from his mother, who played the accordion.

Music
He was influenced by the playing of William Carroll and Laurence Nugent, from Lack, County Fermanagh. His name is now internationally known since he passed on many tunes and songs to Cathal McConnell of the group The Boys of the Lough.

Eddie Duffy and Mick Hoy Memorial Traditional Music Festival

In memory of Eddie Duffy, the Eddie Duffy and Mick Hoy Memorial Traditional Music Festival takes place every year on the second weekend in October in Derrygonnelly.

See also
Irish flute
Mick Hoy (musician)

References

External links

Folk singers from Northern Ireland
Flautists from Northern Ireland
Musicians from County Fermanagh
1986 deaths
1894 births
20th-century male singers from Northern Ireland
20th-century flautists